Emilio Ribeiro Neves da Silva, known simply as Emílio da Silva; born 5 April 1982 in Dili, Timor Timur, Indonesia, is a footballer from East Timor who has represented AD Esperança since 2004. Prior to this, da Silva played for FC Zebra for two years, having spent the entirety of his youth career (2000–2002) there also.
A prolific striker at club level, he has also notched 10 goals in 25 caps for the Timor-Leste national football team since 2003, and is their all-time top scorer and appearance holder, both by a considerable margin. Da Silva is considered to be the best East Timorese footballer of all time. In 2011, Emilio was the highest paid athlete from East Timor, making $20,000 (USD).

International career
Da Silva scored two goals during Timor-Leste's unsuccessful 2010 FIFA World Cup qualifying campaign, both against Hong Kong.

International goals
Scores and results list East Timor's goal tally first.

References

1982 births
Living people
People from Dili
East Timorese footballers
Association football forwards
Timor-Leste international footballers